José Amado Orihuela Trejo (born 5 January 1954) is a Mexican politician affiliated with the Institutional Revolutionary Party. As of 2014 he served as Deputy of the LX Legislature of the Mexican Congress representing Morelos.

References

1954 births
Living people
Politicians from Morelos
Institutional Revolutionary Party politicians
21st-century Mexican politicians
Chapingo Autonomous University alumni
Deputies of the LX Legislature of Mexico
Members of the Chamber of Deputies (Mexico) for Morelos